The Boatman's Call is the tenth studio album by Nick Cave and the Bad Seeds, released in 1997. The album is entirely piano-based, alternately somber and romantic in mood, making it a marked departure from the bulk of the band's post-punk catalogue up to that point. The Boatman's Call remains one of the most critically acclaimed releases of Nick Cave's career.

Background and production
Recording for the album began at Sarm West Studios in London, United Kingdom in mid-1996, with "The Garden Duet", one of the album's outtakes, being the first song recorded. Though the bulk of The Boatman's Call was recorded at Sarm West, further recordings — including overdubs — were later done at Abbey Road Studios.

Musically, the album's tone is considered sombre and minimalist and marks a major departure for Cave and The Bad Seeds. Moving away from full-band arrangements and character-based narratives, the album's music and lyrics move towards the more intimate sound of Cave's solo voice accompanied by piano or a few other instruments. The tempo is also generally slow, reflecting many of the moods of the songs. Many of the lyrics seem to reflect on Cave's personal relationships and spiritual yearnings at the time of writing. Some songs are thought to be directed at either the mother of Cave's oldest son Luke, Viviane Carneiro (in "Where Do We Go Now But Nowhere?") or singer PJ Harvey, with whom he had a brief relationship around that time (as referenced in "West Country Girl", "Black Hair" and "Green Eyes"). "Green Eyes" includes a line from “Sonnet 18”, by Louise Labé (Kiss me, rekiss me, & kiss me again).

Cave performed "Into My Arms" at the 1997 funeral of INXS vocalist Michael Hutchence, an old friend from Cave's youth, and requested that the TV cameras be shut off for his performance out of respect for Hutchence. The song "People Ain't No Good" was also featured in the movie Shrek 2. The song “There Is A Kingdom” was featured in the movie Zack Snyder's Justice League. In October 2010, the album was listed in the top 30 in the book, 100 Best Australian Albums.

Critical reception

The Boatman's Call received almost unanimous critical acclaim upon release with many reviewers citing it as Cave's most poignant album. NME rated it as the 23rd best album of 1997. The album was also included in the book 1001 Albums You Must Hear Before You Die.

Track listing

Bonus tracks

Outtakes and other songs
A number of other songs were recorded at The Boatman's Call sessions, some of which were later released as B-sides to the album's two singles and also on Nick Cave and the Bad Seeds 2005 compilation album, B-Sides and Rarities.

"The Garden Duet"
"I Do, Dear, I Do"
"Opium Tea" (released on B-Sides & Rarities)
"Sheep May Safely Graze" (released on B-Sides & Rarities)
"Wake Up My Lover"
"Farewell, Goodbye, So Long"
"I Got Another Woman Now, Dear"
"Little Empty Boat" (released as a B-side on "Into My Arms")
"Right Now I'm A-Roaming" (released as a B-side on "Into My Arms")
"Come Into My Sleep" (released as a B-side on "(Are You) The One That I've Been Waiting For?")
"Babe, I Got You Bad" (released as a B-side on "(Are You) The One That I've Been Waiting For?"')

Personnel
Nick Cave and the Bad Seeds
Nick Cave – vocals (1-17), piano (1-3, 8, 11-13, 15), organ (2, 5, 10, 11), keyboards (casio) (4), vibes (3), keyboard (14)
Mick Harvey – electric guitar (6, 10, 13, 14, 17), acoustic guitar (5, 7, 8, 12), bass (2), organ (6, 13, 14, 16, 17), vibes (3), bass organ (9), backing vocals (14), xylophone (16)
Blixa Bargeld – electric guitar (4, 5, 7, 10, 11, 13, 14, 16, 17), piano treatment (8), backing vocals (13-14)
Martyn P. Casey – bass (1, 3-8, 10, 11, 13-17), backing vocals (13)
Conway Savage – piano (5-7, 10, 14, 16, 17), backing vocals (5)
Warren Ellis – violin (3, 7-8, 10, 11), accordion (9), piano (9), looped violin (13)
Jim Sclavunos – drums (6), melodica (12), bells (5, 14), percussion (13), organ (15), bongos (16), tambourine (17)
Thomas Wydler – drums (2, 3, 5, 7, 8, 10, 11, 13-17), maracas (4), backing vocals (13)

Technical personnel
Flood - producer, engineer, mixing
Chris Scard - co-producer, mixing
Paul Corkett - engineer
Paul Hicks - assistant engineer
Paul Wright - assistant engineer
Nick Cave and the Bad Seeds - additional production

Charts

Weekly charts

Year-end charts

Certifications

References

1997 albums
Nick Cave albums
Mute Records albums
Reprise Records albums